Tuman (meaning Mist) was a Soviet patrol boat that engaged a battle with German destroyers during World War II, fought in Arctic waters of the Barents Sea in 1941.

Ship history

On October 19, 1939, just before the commencement of the Soviet-Finnish War, the trawler was called into the navy as DC-10 (Patrol Ship Number 10). In a list dated March 4, 1940, it is listed in the category of escort ships. It was provided with an armament of two dual purpose 45 mm guns, two light 7.62 mm caliber machine guns, and depth charges.

Sinking
On August 10, 1941, the ship was on patrol under the command of Lieutenant L. Shestakov on the line Tsyp-Navolok—Kildin Island when it encountered three German destroyers (and ). The Tuman reported this sighting to Northern Fleet Command, which fulfilled the ship's mission instructions.

Tuman then laid down a smoke screen and began evasive action. The German destroyers, which had a massive superiority in armament, closed to within  and begin hitting the craft. Tuman sustained eleven direct hits from  shells and the captain and commissar were killed. Damage to the aft gun prevented Tuman from returning fire. The German fire shot the ship's flag from the mast, but a wounded sailor (K. D. Semenov) and the senior radio operator (V. K. Blinov) raised it again.

Opening late due to poor interoperability, fire from Soviet shore batteries drove off the German destroyers (Z4 Richard Beitzen suffered some damage by near miss). Together with the smoke screen, this allowed the lives of 37 of the 52 crew members to be saved from Tuman, which sank. That evening, surviving crewmen were presented with tributes from the workers of Murmansk.

A capsule of seawater from this point was embedded in the giant statue Defenders of the Soviet Arctic during the Great Patriotic War.

References

 Kobchikov, E. Y. ''The Death Battle of the Patrol Ship "Mist", Gangut (() #6, 1993)

External links
  
  
  (Includes a detailed schematic of the craft) 

Trawlers of the Soviet Navy
World War II naval ships of the Soviet Union
World War II shipwrecks in the Arctic Ocean
1931 ships
1941 in the Soviet Union
Ships built in Danzig
Maritime incidents in August 1941